Daniel Mark Lewin (May 14, 1970 – September 11, 2001), sometimes spelled Levin, was an American–Israeli mathematician and entrepreneur who co-founded internet company Akamai Technologies.  A passenger on board American Airlines Flight 11, it is believed that Lewin was stabbed to death by Satam al-Suqami, one of the hijackers of that flight, and was the first victim of the September 11 attacks.

Early life
Lewin was born May 14, 1970, in Denver, Colorado, and moved to Israel with his parents at age 14 and was raised in Israel.

Career
Lewin served for four years in the Israel Defense Forces (IDF) as an officer in Sayeret Matkal, one of the IDF's special forces units. Lewin earned the rank of captain.

He attended the Technion – Israel Institute of Technology in Haifa while simultaneously working at IBM's research laboratory in the city. While at IBM, he was responsible for developing the Genesys system, a processor verification tool that is used widely within IBM and in other companies such as Advanced Micro Devices and SGS-Thomson.

Upon receiving a Bachelor of Arts and a Bachelor of Science, summa cum laude, in 1995, he traveled to Cambridge, Massachusetts, to begin graduate studies toward a Ph.D at the Massachusetts Institute of Technology (MIT) in 1996. While there, he and his advisor, Professor F. Thomson Leighton, came up with consistent hashing, an innovative algorithm for optimizing Internet traffic. These algorithms became the basis for Akamai Technologies, which the two founded in 1998. Lewin served as the company's chief technology officer and a board member, and achieved great wealth during the height of the Internet boom.

Death and legacy
Lewin was reportedly stabbed aboard American Airlines Flight 11 as it was hijacked during the September 11 attacks. A 2001 FAA memo suggests he may have been stabbed by Satam al-Suqami after attempting to foil the hijacking. According to the memo, Lewin was seated in business class in seat 9B, close to hijackers Mohamed Atta, Abdulaziz al-Omari and al-Suqami. It was first reported that he had been shot by al-Suqami, although the final draft of the memo dropped all references to gunfire. According to the 9/11 Commission, Lewin was stabbed by one of the hijackers, probably Satam al-Suqami, who was seated directly behind him. Flight attendants on the plane who contacted airline officials from the plane reported that Lewin's throat was slashed, probably by the terrorist sitting behind him. The 9/11 Commission speculated that Lewin, who had served four years in the Israeli military, may have attempted to confront Atta or Omari, who had been seated in front of him, not knowing that al-Suqami was sitting just behind him. Lewin was identified as the first victim of the September 11 attacks.

Lewin, who was 31, was survived by his wife Anne and his two sons, Eitan and Itamar, who were aged five and eight at the time of the September 2001 attacks.

In July 2004, it was reported that Lewin's recovered remains had been identified.

After his death, the intersection of Main and Vassar Streets in Cambridge, Massachusetts, was renamed Danny Lewin Square in his honor. The award given to the best student-written paper at the ACM Symposium on Theory of Computing (STOC) was also named the Danny Lewin Best Student Paper Award, in his honor. In 2011, on the tenth anniversary of his death, Lewin's contributions to the Internet were memorialized by friends and colleagues.

At the National 9/11 Memorial, Lewin is memorialized at the North Pool, on Panel N-75.

Lewin is the subject of the 2013 biography No Better Time: The Brief, Remarkable Life of Danny Lewin, the Genius Who Transformed the Internet by Molly Knight Raskin.

Awards
1995 – Technion named him the year's Outstanding Student in Computer Engineering.
1998 – Morris Joseph Levin Award for Best Masterworks Thesis Presentation at MIT.

References

External links

 Consistent hashing for relieving hot spots on the world wide web, Akamai Technologies.
 Daniel was an inspiration, Ynetnews.
 The Akamai Network: A Platform for High-Performance Internet Applications, Erik Nygren, Ramesh K. Sitaraman, and Jennifer Sun, ACM SIGOPS Operating Systems Review, Vol. 44, No.3, July 2010.
 

American Airlines Flight 11 victims
1970 births
2001 deaths
American computer scientists
American emigrants to Israel
American terrorism victims
Murdered American Jews
IBM employees
Deaths by stabbing in New York (state)
Israeli computer scientists
Israeli terrorism victims
Businesspeople from Denver
Massachusetts Institute of Technology alumni
Naturalized citizens of Israel
People from Cambridge, Massachusetts
Victims of aviation accidents or incidents in the United States
Israeli soldiers
Terrorism deaths in New York (state)
People murdered in New York City
Male murder victims
Israeli Jews
Burials at Sharon Memorial Park, Massachusetts
Akamai Technologies people